Jason Gleasman (born March 27, 1975) is an American wrestler. He competed in the men's Greco-Roman 100 kg at the 1996 Summer Olympics.

References

External links
 

1975 births
Living people
American male sport wrestlers
Olympic wrestlers of the United States
Wrestlers at the 1996 Summer Olympics
Sportspeople from Wilmington, Delaware